This the complete discography of South African alternative rock band Prime Circle, that formed in 2000 from  Witbank, Mpumalanga. In total, the band has released six studio albums, three compilation albums, four DVDs , twenty singles and ten music videos.

Albums

Studio albums

Special Editions

Compilations

DVD

Singles

Music videos

References
Alternative rock discographies
Discographies of South African artists